Min Tid Skal Komme (Norwegian for My Time Shall Come) is the debut album by the Norwegian avant-garde metal band Fleurety. The album was re-released in 2003 with the inclusion of their EP A Darker Shade of Evil by Candlelight Records. In 2008 it was re-released on vinyl in a limited edition of 600 copies through Aesthetic Death Records. In 2019 Peaceville Records remastered and re-released the album on CD and vinyl with the original artwork.

All music and lyrics are by Svein Egil Hatlevik and Alexander Nordgaren.

Track listing
"Fragmenter Av En Fortid" – 9:37
"En Skikkelse I Horisonten" – 11:33
"Hvileløs?" – 5:24
"Englers Piler Har Ingen Brodd" – 12:32
"Fragmenter Av En Fremtid" – 5:37

Reissue
"Fragmenter Av En Fortid" (Fragments Of A Past) – 9:30
"En Skikkelse I Horisonten" (A Shape In The Horizon)– 11:28
"Hvileløs" (Restless)– 5:21
"Englers Piler Har Ingen Brodd" (Angels' Arrows Have No Sting) – 12:28
"Fragmenter Av En Fremtid" (Fragments Of A Future)– 5:42
"Absence" – 5:58
"Profanations Beneath The Bleeding Stars" – 5:12
"...And The Choirs Behind Him" – 1:31
"My Resurrection In Eternal Hate" – 4:58

Credits
Alexander Nordgaren - Guitar, Vocals (additional)
Svein Egil Hatlevik - Keyboards, Drums, Vocals
Per Amund Solberg - Bass
Marian Aas Hansen - Additional Vocals

References 

1995 debut albums
Fleurety albums